Location Songs was a music publisher in Stockholm, Sweden. It was a follow-on to Cheiron Studios, which despite its success, was closed down in 2000. Following this, Max Martin and Tom Talomaa started a new production company together named Maratone in January 2001. David Kreuger and Per Magnusson started A Side Productions and Kristian Lundin started a third studio, The Location, together with Jake Schulze at the same location as Cheiron Studios. 

The studio closed down in 2006 and it was leased by Roxy Recordings in 2007.

Producers and songwriters 
Andreas Carlsson
Kristian Lundin
Jake Schulze
Carl Björsell
Karl Engström
Carl Falk
Savan Kotecha
Didrik Thott
Sebastian Thott

External links
 Official Website

Recording studios in Sweden
Buildings and structures in Stockholm
Music in Stockholm
Swedish music
Music publishing companies of Sweden
Publishing companies established in 2001